Mark Randall Bobb (January 1, 1948 – June 13, 1982) was a right-handed catcher in Major League Baseball for the Chicago Cubs.

Originally drafted by the California Angels in the 3rd round (43rd overall) of the 1966 amateur draft out of Verdugo Hills High School in Tujunga, California, Bobb did not sign, opting to play at Arizona State University. The year of college baseball paid off, as the Chicago Cubs made Bobb the second overall selection in the first round of the June 1967 draft's secondary phase. Bobb made his major league debut just 14 months later, catching the final four innings of an 8-0 Cubs defeat on August 15, 1968. He made his first major league start six days later in the second game of a doubleheader against the Atlanta Braves. His first (and only) major league hit came in the 4th inning, a single off Ron Reed. Bobb appeared in four more games that season with the Cubs and was the eighth-youngest player to appear in the National League in 1968.

Bobb was again called up to the majors in September 1969 as the Cubs were undergoing an historic collapse that would see them lose the division title to the New York Mets. Bobb appeared in three games, going 0-for-2 at the plate. Before the 1970 season, the Cubs traded him to the Mets for 32-year-old catcher J.C. Martin, who would go on to be the Cubs' backup backstop for the next three years. Despite just being 21 years of age, Bobb never returned to the major leagues.

Bobb died on June 13, 1982 following a car accident.

References

External links

1948 births
1982 deaths
Baseball players from Los Angeles
Chicago Cubs players
Major League Baseball catchers
Road incident deaths in California
Arizona State Sun Devils baseball players
Caldwell Cubs players
Arizona League Cubs players
San Antonio Missions players
Lodi Crushers players
Tacoma Cubs players
Tulsa Oilers (baseball) players
Portland Beavers players
Tidewater Tides players
Memphis Blues players
Midland Cubs players
Knoxville Sox players